Manicouagan is a regional county municipality in the Côte-Nord region of Quebec, Canada. It is located on the north shore of the Saint Lawrence River with its seat in Baie-Comeau. It was created in 1981, and named after the Manicouagan River.

Subdivisions
There are 9 subdivisions and one native reserve within the RCM:

Cities & Towns (1)
 Baie-Comeau

Municipalities (1)
 Franquelin

Parishes (1)
 Ragueneau

Villages (5)
 Baie-Trinité
 Chute-aux-Outardes
 Godbout
 Pointe-aux-Outardes
 Pointe-Lebel

Unorganized Territory (1)
 Rivière-aux-Outardes

Native Reserves (1)
 Pessamit

Demographics

Population

Language

Transportation

Access Routes
Highways and numbered routes that run through the municipality, including external routes that start or finish at the county border:

 Autoroutes
 None

 Principal Highways
 

 Secondary Highways
 

 External Routes
 None

See also
 List of regional county municipalities and equivalent territories in Quebec

References

External links 
  

Regional county municipalities in Côte-Nord
Census divisions of Quebec
Baie-Comeau